Toruń is a Polish parliamentary constituency in the Kuyavian-Pomeranian Voivodeship.  It elects thirteen members of the Sejm.

The district has the number '5' and is named after the city of Toruń.  It includes the counties of Aleksandrów, Brodnica, Chełmno, Golub-Dobrzyń, Grudziądz, Lipno, Radziejów, Rypin, Toruń, Wąbrzeźno, and Włocławek, and the city counties of Grudziądz, Toruń, and Włocławek.

List of members

2019-2023

Footnotes

Electoral districts of Poland
Kuyavian-Pomeranian Voivodeship
Toruń